Mathieu-Cyprien Renaudin (27 March 1757, Saint-Denis-d'Oléron – 14 February 1836, Saint-Denis d'Oléron) was a French Navy officer. He was cousin to Jean François Renaudin.

Career 
Renaudin started sailing as a seaman in 1781 before rising to Ensign on the 20-gun corvette Perdrix.

On 13 May 1793, he was appointed first officer to the frigate Andromaque, under Jean François Renaudin, on which he sustained a fight against a ship of the line and four Spanish frigates.

On 26 February 1794, Renaudin was appointed first officer on the 74-gun Vengeur du Peuple, still under his cousin. He took part in the Glorious First of June, survived the sinking of Vengeur and was taken prisoner by the British. His report states that he refused to follow Captain Renaudin when he abandoned his ship, and stayed behind to attempt and rescue the wounded of Vengeur.

In 1800, Renaudin was Captain, and was Perrée's flag officer on Généreux at the Battle of the Malta Convoy. There, he was captured with the surrender of Généreux. He was subsequently honourably acquitted during the automatic court-martial for the loss of his ship.

A street of Saint Denis d'Oléron was named in his honour.

Notes and references

Notes

References

Bibliography 
 
 
 

 Fonds Marine. Campagnes (opérations ; divisions et stations navales ; missions diverses). Inventaire de la sous-série Marine BB4. Tome premier : BB4 1 à 482 (1790–1826) 

1757 births
1836 deaths
French naval commanders of the Napoleonic Wars
People from Charente-Maritime